The Europe/Africa Zone was one of the three zones of the regional Davis Cup competition in 1993.

In the Europe/Africa Zone there were three different tiers, called groups, in which teams competed against each other to advance to the upper tier. Winners in Group I advanced to the World Group Qualifying Round, along with losing teams from the World Group first round. Teams who lost in the first round competed in the relegation play-offs, with winning teams remaining in Group I, whereas teams who lost their play-offs were relegated to the Europe/Africa Zone Group II in 1994.

Participating nations

Draw

  and  relegated to Group II in 1994.

First round

Luxembourg vs. Kenya

Hungary vs. Finland

Norway vs. Zimbabwe

Second round

Portugal vs. Israel

Belgium vs. Luxembourg

Hungary vs. Great Britain

Zimbabwe vs. Croatia

Relegation play-off

Finland vs. Norway

Notes

References

External links
Davis Cup official website

Davis Cup Europe/Africa Zone
Europe Africa Zone Group I